Tony Arnel Massenburg (born July 31, 1967) is an American former professional basketball player. He shares a National Basketball Association (NBA) record with Chucky Brown, Jim Jackson, Kevin Ollie & Joe Smith for having played with twelve different teams over his career, which has since been broken by Ish Smith.

College career

Massenburg played in college for the University of Maryland from 1986 to 1990, playing under three different head coaches: Lefty Driesell, Bob Wade, and Gary Williams.  He had a career field goal shooting percentage of 52.3% and averaged 12.1 points per game in his four-year career with the Terrapins. In his senior season, in which he was featured on the cover of the team's handbook on an aircraft carrier, he averaged 18 points and 10.1 rebounds per game. He was one of only two players in the Atlantic Coast Conference to average double figures in both categories that season. His efforts in his senior season earned him a spot on the All-ACC Second Team.

Professional career

San Antonio Spurs (1990-1991)

Massenburg was selected with the 43rd pick in the second round of the 1990 NBA draft by the San Antonio Spurs. During his first stint with the Spurs, he was able to play alongside NBA legend David Robinson. He played in 35 games with the Spurs during the 1990–91 NBA season.

Pallacanestro Reggiana (1991)

As part of his first career NBA injury's rehabilitation program, Massenburg went to the Italian League in 1991, where he averaged almost 23 points and 10 rebounds per game in four games with the Italian club Pallacanestro Reggiana.

San Antonio Spurs (1991)

Massenburg returned to the NBA and his former team the Spurs, however he only played 1 game for the franchise as he was waived on November 2, 1991, in the beginning of the 1991-1992 season.

Charlotte Hornets (1991-1992) 
On December 11, 1991, Massenburg signed with the Charlotte Hornets where he played for three games before being waived again on January 7, 1992.

Boston Celtics (1992) 
On January 10, 1992, Massenburg signed a 10-day contract with the Boston Celtics for seven games.

Golden State Warriors (1992) 
On February 13, 1992, he signed another 10-day contract with the Golden State Warriors for another seven games; ending his season with a total of 18 games and 90 minutes played with four franchises that season.

Unicaja-Mayoral (1992-1993)

Massenburg played in the Spanish League with Unicaja-Mayoral for the 1992–1993 season.

FC Barcelona (1993-1994) 
He also played for another Spanish team FC Barcelona during the 1993–94 season. He won both the Spanish King's Cup championship and the Catalan League championship with Barcelona in 1994.

Los Angeles Clippers (1994-1995)

Massenburg returned to the NBA again in the 1994 offseason when he was signed by the Los Angeles Clippers on June 27, 1994. Massenburg came just short of playing an entire NBA season for the first time in his career during the 1994–95 season for 80 games. Massenburg was taken in the NBA expansion draft in 1995 by the Toronto Raptors. After 24 games there, he was shipped to the Philadelphia 76ers, where he played 30 games.

During the 1996-97 season, Massenburg once again came very close to playing an entire NBA season, seeing action in 79 games with yet another team, the New Jersey Nets. Massenburg returned to Canada for the 1997–98 season, playing with the Brian Winters-coached Vancouver Grizzlies. In Vancouver, Massenburg backed up center Bryant Reeves. He played two seasons in Vancouver before being traded before the 1999-2000 season to the Houston Rockets. With the Rockets, he played in ten games, then was promptly returned to the Grizzlies before the 2000-2001 campaign. When the franchise relocated to Memphis in 2001, so did Massenburg. During the Grizzlies' first season on U.S. soil, Massenburg played in 73 games, averaging 5.5 points per game. In successive years, he was a member of the Utah Jazz and the Sacramento Kings.

Massenburg returned to the Spurs for the 2004-05 season and with them he won an NBA championship ring that year, when the Spurs defeated the Detroit Pistons four games to three in the 2005 NBA Finals.  During the series Massenburg mainly observed from the bench as his teammates clinched the Spurs' third NBA title in seven years.  Unfortunately however, six weeks after the finals ended, a late-night auto accident badly damaged Massenburg's ankle, leaving him unable to play the following two seasons.

After being out with the ankle injury for two seasons, Massenburg attempted an NBA comeback in the year 2007 with the Washington Wizards, but he was waived by the team before the season started. He then signed with the Arecibo Captains, a Puerto Rican team, but was released shortly after. In his NBA career, Massenburg participated in 683 NBA games over 15 seasons. He scored 4,238 points in his career for a career average of 6.2 points per game. He collected 2,964 rebounds in his career for a career average of 4.3 rebounds per game. He had 266 assists in his career, for a career average 0.4 assists per game.

Later life
In 2010 Massenburg started a sports bar in the Kentlands area of Gaithersburg, Maryland with former NBA coach James Lloyd called Tony & James.  It was later renamed 44 Sports Bar, which reflected Massenburg's jersey number.

In December 2013, Tony Massenburg's jersey number was retired at Sussex Central High School (VA), along with that of Reginald Givens (a former NFL linebacker).  These two men were the only two athletes from the school ever to play a sport professionally.

Massenburg now contributes to CSN Mid-Atlantic's Washington Wizards coverage.

Works 
 Tony Massenburg, Walt Williams, Lessons from Lenny: The Journey Beyond a Shooting Star, Whyde Range Productions, 2018.

References

External links 

NBA.com's Massenburg page

1967 births
Living people
American expatriate basketball people in Canada
American expatriate basketball people in Italy
American expatriate basketball people in Spain
American men's basketball players
Basketball players from Virginia
Boston Celtics players
Baloncesto Málaga players
Charlotte Hornets players
FC Barcelona Bàsquet players
Golden State Warriors players
Houston Rockets players
Liga ACB players
Los Angeles Clippers players
Maryland Terrapins men's basketball players
Memphis Grizzlies players
New Jersey Nets players
Pallacanestro Reggiana players
People from Sussex County, Virginia
Philadelphia 76ers players
Power forwards (basketball)
Sacramento Kings players
San Antonio Spurs draft picks
San Antonio Spurs players
Toronto Raptors expansion draft picks
Toronto Raptors players
Utah Jazz players
Vancouver Grizzlies players